Wellston School District was a school district in the inner-ring suburb of Wellston, Missouri.  It is home to 4 schools.  The district has 633 students total. The district was closed at the end of the 2009-10 school year and merged into the Normandy School District by order of the Missouri State Board of Education.

Schools
Eskridge High School is the only high school in the Wellston School District.  It currently has 166 students and serves grades 9-12.
Bishop Middle School is the only middle school in the Wellston School District.  It serves grades 6-8.
Central Elementary School is Wellston School District's only elementary school.  It serves grades 1-5.
Wellston Early Childhood Center serves all of the kindergarteners.

References

School districts in Missouri
Education in St. Louis County, Missouri
School districts disestablished in 2010